The Joseon Army (Korean: 조선군대; Hanja: 朝鮮軍隊) was the army of the Korean dynasty of Joseon. The army defended the northern borders but seldom defended the southern regions. The army was best known for fending off the Jurchen raids and conquering the Korean peninsula. However, Joseon's neo-confucianism disavowed military development, causing them to be vulnerable to Japanese and Manchu invasions. Despite this, Joseon kept strengthening the army until the 19th century, when western powers and the Japanese forced them to open doors and modernize the army.

History

Early Period
The armed forces of the former Goryeo kingdom were Joseon's armed forces during the reign of King Taejo. However, the officials of the Joseon court commanded private armies from the previous kingdom. Yi Bang-won and his officers staged a coup against Taejo and his brother Jeongjong of Joseon, inciting the first and second strife of the princes. He advised Jeongjong to ban the ownership of private armies and become king in favor of having a central army. When Sejong ascended the throne, he created various military regulations to strengthen the safety of his kingdom, supported the advancement of Korean military technology, including the development of the cannon, mortars, fire arrows and the use of gunpowder.

Joseon–Jurchen border conflicts
Like Goryeo, Joseon made the Jurchens in the area around Hamhung on the northeastern Korean peninsula submit as vassals. The Joseon Koreans tried to deal with the military threat posed by the Jurchens by using both forceful means and incentives and by launching military attacks. At the same time, they tried to appease them with titles and degrees, traded with them and sought to acculturate them by having Korean women marry Jurchens and integrating them into Korean culture. Despite these measures, fighting continued between the Jurchen and the Koreans. The Ming Yongle Emperor was determined to wrest the Jurchens out of Korean influence and have China dominate them instead. Korea tried to persuade Jurchen leader Mentemu (Möngke Temür) to reject the Ming overtures, but were unsuccessful since Möngke Temür folded and submitted to the Ming. In 1433, Sejong sent Kim Jongseo (hangul: 김종서, hanja: 金宗瑞), a prominent general, north to destroy the Jurchens. Kim's military campaign engaged the Jurchen clans such as the Odoli, Maolian and Udige capturing several castles, taking control of Hamgyong and continued pushing north expanding Korean territory to the Songhua River. He then established 4 counties, 6 garrisons, and several border forts in the region to safeguard the people from the Jurchens shaping the modern borders of Korea around 1450.

Oei Invasion
In 1419, King Sejong sent Yi Jongmu to raid the Japanese on Tsushima Island in the Oei Invasion as a response to Japanese Wokou raids on Korean coastal cities. Yi took 227 Korean ships and approximately 17,000 soldiers, landed, attacked, and plundered Japanese pirate settlements on Tsushima Island. The So clan, the ruling family of Tsushima, requested negotiations. In the diplomatic exchanges that followed, Korea permitted the So clan to continue trade with Korean coastal harbors under the condition that the clan suppresses the activities of Japanese pirates.

Yi Si-ae's Rebellion
When King Sejo came to power he strengthened the monarchy established by King Taejong by weakening the power of the State Council and bringing staff directly under the king's control. He also strengthened the administrative system to enable the government to determine exact population numbers and to mobilize troops effectively but caused Yi Si-ae's Rebellion. Yi Si-ae led the Iksok Force and the rebel army killing officials from the central government for not appointing northern officials to govern the northern provinces until they were defeated soon after the Battle of Manryeong.

Japanese Invasions of Korea

By the 16th century, the military became weak by the disavowment from Confucian scholars. During the Imjin War, Joseon mobilizing few military units with nan army. Its defense depended heavily on the mobilization of the citizen soldiers in case of emergency. When Japan invaded Korea, Joseon deployed a total of 84,500 regular troops. During the first invasion, the Joseon army was no match for their sheer numbers armed with arquebuses and a combination of arms, and the Japanese pushed them north to Pyeongyang. When the navy, and the Righteous Army cut off supply lines, this gave the regular army a chance to force the Japanese back to Pusan through many strategic battles. During the 1595–1596 Truce, Seonjo realized how important it was and tried to reform it with the help of Ming generals and established army training centers. Ryu Seong-ryong, the Prime Minister, spoke out about the Korean disadvantages. He examined why the Japanese had quickly overrun them and pointed out the flaws of their defense systems. Ryu also pointed out how efficient the Japanese army was since it took them only one month to get Hanseong and how well organized they were. He noted how the Japanese moved their units in complex maneuvers, often weakening their enemy with arquebuses, then attacking with melee weapons. These reforms helped Joseon Army repel the second invasion of the Japanese army and win the war.

Yi Gwal's Rebellion
After the Injo Coup, the dissatisfied Yi Gwal who helped Injo ascend to the throne incited a rebellion against him for trying to arrest his son, Yi Jeon. He led 10,000 of his soldiers to occupy Hanseong and replace him with Heungangun, his royal relative as king. But the Joseon army led by General Jang Man retook the capital and crushed the rebellion. Yi Gwal's Rebellion weakened the military, making them vulnerable to Later Jin's attack.

Manchu-Joseon Conflicts
Conservative Westerners took hard-line policy toward the Jurchen-led Later Jin dynasty, keeping their alliance with the Ming dynasty. The Later Jin, who had remained primarily friendly to Joseon, began to regard Joseon as an enemy. Han Yun, who participated in the rebellion of Yi Gwal, fled to Manchuria and urged the Later Jin ruler Nurhaci to attack Joseon; thus, the friendly relationship between the Later Jin and Joseon ended.

Battle of Sarhū

In 1619, the Joseon Expeditionary Force led Commander Gang Hong-rip to engage Later Jin with the Ming Army at the Battle of Sarhū. But the allied forces lost two-thirds of the Joseon Expeditionary Force. The Jurchen released the captives and allowed them to return to their homeland. Gang Hong-rip, however, was kept for his proficiency in the Jurchen language. Later on, General Gang would be led to believe that his family had died in the political turmoil during a coup in his native kingdom of Joseon. To exact his revenge on the Joseon court, he urged Jin to invade Joseon, which led to the First Manchu invasion of Korea in 1627. Only during the peace negotiations did he find out that he had been misled.

The Joseon musketeers being overwhelmed by the Manchu cavalry prompted a revision of military tactics in Korea. In previous decades, the Imjin War was seen as a demonstration of the dominance of the firearm, and Joseon adjusted military forces accordingly. Both sides of the war lacked effective shock cavalry to take advantage of the vulnerabilities of unsupported musketeers. After the defeat at Sarhū, the Joseon forces revised their doctrine to have spearmen supporting the musketeers.

Later Jin invasion of Joseon
In 1627, 30,000 Manchu cavalries under General Amin (阿敏) and former Korean General Gang Hong-rip invaded Joseon, calling for the restoration of Gwanghaegun and execution of Westerners leaders, including Kim Ja-jeom. General Jang Man again fought against Later Jin but could not repel the invasion. Once again, Injo fled to Ganghwa Island. Meanwhile, Jin had no reason to attack Joseon and decided to go back to prepare for war against the Ming, and peace soon settled. The Later Jin and Joseon dynasties were declared brother nations, and Later Jin withdrew from the Korean peninsula. However, most Westerners kept their hard-line policy despite the war. Nurhaci, who had generally good opinions toward Korea, did not invade Korea again; however, when Nurhaci died and Hong Taiji succeeded him as ruler, Jin again began to seek a chance for another war. King Injo provided refuge to Ming general Mao Wenlong and with his unit after they fled from Later Jin and came to Korea; this action caused Later Jin to invade Korea again.

Qing invasion of Joseon

In 1636, Hong Taiji officially renamed his dynasty the Qing dynasty and invaded Joseon personally. The Qing forces purposely avoided battle with General Im Gyeong Eop, a prominent Joseon army commander who was guarding the Uiju Fortress at the time. A Qing army of 128,000 men marched directly into Hanseong before Injo could escape to Ganghwa Island, driving Injo to Namhan Mountain Fortress instead. They ran out of food and supplies after the Manchu cut all supply lines during the siege. Injo finally surrendered to the Qing dynasty ceremoniously, bowing to the Hong Taiji nine times as Hong Taiji's servant and agreeing to the Treaty of Samjeondo, which required Injo to send his first son and second son to China as captives. Joseon then became a tributary state to the Qing dynasty, and the Qing went on to conquer the Central Plain in 1644. Though they lost the wars, their performance left a strong impression on the Manchus. The first emperor of the newly declared Qing dynasty later wrote: "The Koreans are incapable on horseback but do not transgress the principles of the military arts. They excel at infantry fighting."

Military Expansion

Hyojong rose the throne after Injo and Sohyeon's death, he began to reform and expand the military of Korea. First, he removed Kim Ja-jeom, who had corrupted politics and had greater power than the king himself. Then, he called Song Si-yeol (Hangul: 송시열 Hanja:宋時烈) and Kim Sang-heon to his court, who supported the war against the Qing Dynasty. His military expansion was massive, and he also built several border fortresses along Yalu River where Joseon and Qing shared a border. When a band of Dutch sailors, including Hendrick Hamel, drifted on Jeju Island, Hyojong ordered them to build muskets for the army, making it the first time to use firearms since the Imjin War. Hyojong could not implement his plan when his son Hyeonjong stopped him since Joseon had become a tributary state of the Qing Dynasty. The Qing dynasty continued to thrive, expanding quickly into the west after successfully conquering the Ming in 1644. Since the Manchus assimilated the massive Chinese army into their own, they became too mighty to resist. Although reformed and expanded, the Joseon military was no match against the combined Manchu and Chinese forces. Also, the Qing dynasty began to treat Joseon as its friend and closest ally. After Hyojong died, Hyeonjong rose to the throne and continued his father's military expansion and reconstruction of the nation, devastated by the Seven-Year War and two Manchu invasions.

Northern Campaigns
The Naseon Jeongbeol (Hangul: 나선정벌  Hanja: 羅禪征伐), or "Suppression of the Russians" or the Northern campaign began when the expanded Joseon military was first put into action in 1654 when the Qing Dynasty called for help to fight against invading Russians. 150 Joseon musketeers, along with 3,000 Manchus, met the Russian army at the Battle of Hutong (Hangul: 호통 Hanja: 好通), present-day Yilan, which the Qing–Joseon allied forces won. In 1658, Hyojong sent troops again to help the Qing dynasty against Russia. He dispatched 260 Joseon musketeers and cannoneers led by Shin Ryu to join the forces of Ninguta's Military Governor Sarhuda. The joint force sailed down the Hurka and Sungari Rivers and met the Russian troops under the command of an Amur Cossack, Onufrij Stepanov near the fall of the Sungari River into the Amur,  killing 270 Russians and driving them out of Manchu territory. The battles against Russia proved that Hyojong's reform had stabilized the Joseon army, although they never put them into action again. Despite the campaigns, Russia and Joseon remained on good terms.

Hong Gyeong-Rae's Rebellion
By the 19th century, royal relatives controlled the royal court through weak kings causing the military to weaken further. Hong Gyeong-Rae led an insurrection of Yangban and impoverished farmers who were unhappy with their treatment by the central government and oppressive taxation. At its height, the rebellion controlled most of the area north of the Cheongcheon River, including the fortified town of Jeongju, to withstand invasions from Manchuria (part of the Qing Empire). Whenever the rebels took over a district, they opened the government granaries and distributed the grain to the people. However, the insurgents suffered disastrous defeats in the battles of Pine Grove and Four Pine Field and forced the rebels to withdraw to Jeongju, which came under siege by government forces. The rebellion was put down a few months later, on May 29, when the government forces breached the town wall with a gunpowder charge. Thousands of people caught up in the uprising, including boys as young as 10, were executed. Hong Gyeong-Rae died in the fighting. Other rebel leaders were also killed in battle or executed.

Foreign Incursions in Korea

Joseon's isolation policies allowed the military to fire on foreign ships. When the USS General Sherman arrived at Ganghwa Island, they requested the government to open for trade, but the army sank their ship and killed their crew. In 1866, the French launched a putative expedition on Ganghwa Island to demand the government release the catholic priests, but were repulsed by the Tiger Hunters. They spearheaded the defense of Ganghwa with the army. The French left during the winter when they received news that the priests had escaped. In 1871, the Americans too launched a putative expedition to demand the government open for trade and apologize for the General Sherman Incident. The Tiger Hunters again spearheaded the defense, but the army and their coastal fortresses did not match their superior firepower. 20 Koreans were captured as bargaining chips for the Americans but released the prisoners before they left after a diplomatic failure. These small victories and foreign diplomatic defeats made the Joseon Army blind to its inferiority to modern armies. Japan plundered and pillaged Ganghwa Island for firing on their gunboat , finally forcing them to open doors to the world.

Modernization

After opening its ports in 1876, Joseon learned of the world situation. It realized its progress, leading Joseon to promote a progressive movement for 'enlightenment' policies called the Enlightenment Movement (Gaehwaundong). But it took the longest out of all the other modernization projects. In 1880, under King Gojong and his consort Queen Min's joint patronage, they created the Office for Extraordinary State Affairs (Tongnigimu-Amun), consisting of 12 departments charged with diplomacy, trade, finance, and military affairs. In 1881, Gojong and Min spearheaded the military modernization efforts. Joseon dispatched the so-called Gentlemen's Sightseeing Group to Japan or Courtiers' Observation Mission (Sinsayuramdan). They invited the Japanese Army attaché Lieutenant Horimoto Reizō to serve as an adviser in creating a modern army. The Japanese gave military training to eighty to one hundred young men of the aristocracy, establishing the Special Skills Force (Pyŏlgigun, Korean: 별기군). They also sent a royally appointed advisor (Yeongseonsa) and students to Tianjin to learn about the manufacture of firearms and munitions. In January 1882, the government reorganized the Five Army Commands (ogunyeong) into the Palace Guards Garrison (Muwiyŏng, Korean: 무위영) and the Capital Guards Garrison (Changŏyŏng, Korean: 창어영). However, these units were resentful towards the Special Skills Force for better treatment and equipment. Additionally, the army discharged more than 1,000 soldiers in overhauling the military; most were old or disabled. The army did not pay them in rice for thirteen months leading up to the Imo Incident, which claimed the lives of some Japanese military advisors and their legislation and some Joseon officials. Daewongun returned to power momentarily to restore order. Daewongun dismantled the Muwiyŏng, the Changŏyŏng, and the Pyŏlgigun and revived the Five-Army Camps. In December 1882, after Daewongun's arrest, the government disbanded the Five-Army Camps once more. The Chinese lines under Yuan Shikai reorganized and trained into a new Joseon military formation, the Capital Guards Command (Chingunyeong, Korean: 친군영).

Gojong and Min requested the United States for more American military instructors to speed up the military modernization of Korea. In October 1883, American minister Lucius Foote arrived to take command of the modernization of Joseon's older army units that had not started Westernizing. They established their first military factories and a modern armory (Gigichang) and created new military uniforms in 1884. In April 1888, General William McEntyre Dye and two other military instructors arrived from the United States, followed in May by a fourth instructor. They brought about rapid military development. They established a new military school called  and an officers' training program to begin making the armies become more and more on par with the Chinese and the Japanese. After the UK occupied Port Hamilton (Geomun Island) in 1889, the Joseon government took a more effective national defense.

Donghak Peasant Revolution
In January 1894, the modernized army was deployed against the Donghak Peasant Revolution but lost many battles in the beginning due to their sheer numbers and innovative tactics. When Gojong requested help from the Qing to suppress the rebels, the Japanese sent troops to Seoul, demanding the Joseon Government send the Qing back. The government refused, and Japan stormed Gyeongbokgung. Despite resistance from Capital Guards Command, Japan occupied the palace and established a pro-Japanese government beginning the Gabo Reform and the Sino-Japanese War. As per the Gabo Reform, the government disbanded the Capital Guards Garrison. Japan allied with the Joseon Army and finally suppressed the Donghak rebels in December 1895. The Japanese forced the Qing out of Joseon after winning the war.

Gabo Reform
During the Gabo reform, the government, under the direction of the Japanese, established the Hullyeondae or the "Military Training Division." They are an elite regiment of royal guards trained and equipped by the Japanese and led by old Korean Army members who hold pro-Japanese sentiments. Gojong of Korea established the Capital Guards (Siwidae) and the provincial armies, the Jibangdae. The minister of the military supervises the training of the Capital Guards. On 8 October 1895, the Japanese convinced the officers of the Hullyeondae that the royal family was seeking help from the Russians and plotted to assassinate Queen Min. One thousand Hullyeondae troops stormed the palace and defeated the Capital Guards, allowing the ronin to assassinate her. As a result, Gojong ordered the deaths of pro-Japanese officials ending the Gabo Reform. After her death, Gojong disbanded the Military Training Division for their part in the assassination and the Capital Guards in August 1895 for failing to stop the Japanese. He reorganized them into the Chinwidae, a modernized royal guard trained by Russian military advisors, and the Jinwidae, modernized provincial armies. In 1897, he proclaimed Joseon the Korean Empire dedicated to modernizing the country and the army.

Organization

The command system of the army was that one or two provincial commanders from each province commanded a provincial base, and each county and city had a commander. The Joseon Army comprises foot soldiers, archers, musketeers, artillery, cavalry, and elite soldiers, the Pengbaesu and Gabsa. The Pengbaesu are shield-bearing foot soldiers. The Gabsa was the highest caliber of soldiers who served as elite foot soldiers and cavalry (or mounted infantry). A high-ranking officer leads Joseon troops. A mid-ranking officer with two low-ranking officers beside him leads a battle formation consisting of Pengbaesu in the front, gunners following them, spearmen behind them, and archers in the rear. The Gapsa protects the formation on the left and right flanks on foot or horses. Their officers in the Joseon army came exclusively from the yangban, and the king appointed them. Still, they valued scholarship over war as something unworthy of a Confucian gentleman-scholar. The quality of Korean generals varies. Some Korean officers being able, and others being men who had not devoted much time to the study of war, preferred archery, writing, practicing their calligraphy, and reading Confucian classics.

Border Defense Council of Joseon
The Border Defense Council of Joseon was a supreme administrative organ established by the central government after the Disturbance of the Three Ports. It allowed the higher military officers, the Jibyeonsa Jaesang (in Hangul: 지변사재상, in Hanja: 知邊司宰相), to participate in the process of establishing security maneuvers to meticulously keep a keen eye on the issues of the border.

Royal Guard
The Naegeumwi, Gyeomsabok, Woorimwi, and Jungrowi was the royal guard units defending the Geumjung (禁裏) (or Geumjung (禁中), the king's residence. They number up to 50-200 men tasked with guarding the palace and escorting the king. In 1666, King Hyeongjong established the Restriction Guard (Geumgun) by integrating these three units into the Office of the Restriction Guards (Geumguncheong). In 1623, the Restriction Guard divided itself further into the Howechung. In 1755, King Yeongjo renamed the Restriction Guard into the Dragon Guard (Yonghoyeong); its total number of members increased to 700. In 1793, King Jeongjo established the Jangyongyoung. It also served as the elite unit of the central army as Joseon Kings assigned a number of units to serve on the field.

In 1469, King Yejong established the King's Royal Palace Gatekeepers, the Wanggung Sumunjang (왕궁수문장) were a royal guard unit tasked with defending the gates of the five palaces and Hanseong's city gates. King Yeongjo established the Sumunjangcheong (守門將廳) to manage them.

Central Army
King Taejo established the central army (Gyeonggun) in 1392, and his army, which overthrew the Goryeo dynasty, served as its basis. In 1393, he established the Three Armies Headquarters (Ŭihŭng Samgunbu). It was the primary military force in the early Joseon Dynasty and had about 16,000 men initially, but in 1448 it was increased to about 28,000 men. The headquarters was renamed the Five Military Commands (Owi) by King Sejo, making it the basis of the central army. After the Imjin War, King Seonjo replaced the Five Commands for its ineffectiveness with the Capital Defense Standing Army (수도 방어 상비군) consisting of Five Military Camps (ogunyeong) and the Escort Office (Howicheong) to defend the capital and the Gyeonggi Province. Adding to the central army was the Special Military Direct Office (Byeolgunjigcheong).

Five Military Commands
The Five Military Commands was the central army of the Early Joseon Dynasty consisting of five divisions with four brigades, each with about 2,000 gapsa constituting the core force among them and the Five Commands administers them through the General Headquarters (Owido), recruiting people from all provinces and the capital. The Owi defended Eight Provinces of Korea with the right guard in P'yŏngan, the rearguard in Hamgyŏng, the center guard in Hwanghae, Gangwon, Gyeonggi, and Chungcheong, the front guard in Jeolla, and the left guard in Gyeongsang.

Gapsa

The Gapsa are the men-at-arms, the elite warriors of the central army armed with various weapons and armor at the time of King Seongjong, around the time of the publication of Gyeongguk Daejeon, they number about 14,800. Gyeonggapsa was stationed in Seoul, Yanggyegapsa stationed in Pyeongan-do and Hamgyeong-do, the border regions, Gigapsa on horseback, and Chakhogapsa was used to fight tigers. The army officers recruit the gapsa based on their martial arts proficiency. Gapsa were initially chosen from among the children of the Yangban and underwent rigorous training and performed several menial duties such as preparing horses and armaments. When a Gapsa completes his military service at Gyeonggapsa, he receives a commission and a 4th rank according to the Geogwan Act. However, filling the Gapsa ranks was difficult due to the ruling class's avoidance of military service. During the Imjin War, Seonjo disbanded the Gapsa along with the Five Military Commands and converted them into the Sogo System for their inadequacy.

Five Army Command

The Five Army Command (ogunyeong) defended Hanseong and the surrounding fortresses primarily in Gyeonggi Province. Each king established one or more camps during their reign.  The ogunyeong started in September 1593 as a single military camp when King Seonjo and Ryu Seong-Ryong established the Military Training Command (Hunlyeondogam, alternately translated as Military Training Command). The agency carefully divided the army into units and companies. The companies had archers, arquebusiers, sworders, and spear infantry squads. The agency set up army divisions in each region of Korea and garrisoned battalions at castles. The upper-class citizens and enslaved people were subject to the draft. All males had to enter military service to be trained and familiarized with weapons. It was also around this time that the military scholar Han Gyo (한교) wrote the martial arts manual Muyejebo, based on the book Jixiao Xinshu by the famous Chinese General Qi Jiguang. The agency initially had less than 80 troops and soon grew to about 10,000. In 1622-1624, Injo established three more camps to counter the Qing invasions after Yi Gwal's rebellion, the Royal Guards Command (Eoyeongcheong), Command of the Northern Approaches (Chongyungcheong), and the Royal Defense Command (Sueocheong). The Royal Guards Command had 260 artillery troops to defend the city walls of Hanseong and suppress rebellions. It grew to 7,000 troops after the Qing invasion, and during Hyojong's reign, 21,000 troops. The Command of the Northern Approaches defended the northern outskirts of Hanseong through the Bukhansanseong Fortress with 23,500 soldiers. The Royal Defense Command defended to defend south of Hanseong through Namhanseong Fortress with 16,500 troops. Sukjeong established the Capital Garrison (Geumwiyeong) to defend Hanyang and escort the king with 85,000 soldiers. Among them are 30,000 professional soldiers based on the military elements from the other four military camps. It was reassigned as an independent army by King Yeongjo. In 1704, King Sukjong assigned the Military Training Agency, the Royal Guards Command, and the Capital Garrison to serve as the Three Military Garrisons. Their duty was to guard the Three Military Gates (Samgunmun) to strengthen Hanseong's defenses and escort the king. In 1745, after the 1728 Musin Rebellion, King Yeongjo realized the confusion of duties between these camps. He reorganized the gates in greater detail by dividing the responsibilities of the military camps to maintain order in the capital.

National Defense Systems

The Joseon Government established various defense systems to set up provincial armies and raise militias. The local troops and militias were mostly poor commoners and enslaved people pressed into service through corvée. Their training was inadequate, and many literati and officials tried to reform the provincial armies numerous times through these systems. After the Imjin War, the government reorganized the five local guards into the Northwestern Frontier Provincial Deployment Army (서북병 배치 지방군) and the Royal Provincial Army (각지 근왕병).

Jingwan System
The Jingwan System was a provincial defense system that dates back to the Goryeo Dynasty, building fortresses in strategically important places. Still, it leaves some parts of the nations open to invasion, and if one falls, it will be catastrophic in any war. In 1457 A.D, King Sejo reshuffled the defense system to secure as many defensive fortresses as possible to enhance the defensive depth. It comprises a Jujin, the main fortress commanded by a Byeongsa, a provincial military commander who takes a regional defense and orders lower unit commanders. A Geojin, a medium-sized local administrative unit commanded by a Byeongmajeoljesa or Cheomjeoljesa (Geojin Military Commander) between the provincial capital and small local towns called Jejins, who are commanded by the chief local magistrates or a military commander. Using this strategic composition, a Jingwan fights and defend their provinces, and every province has several independent Jingwans. Under this system, the roles of local commanders were to be stationed at their post, know the local topography inside and out, draft the operation plan, train local soldiers, and defend their defensive quarter by mobilizing their local soldiers in the case of conflict. However, when there was a massive invasion, there were not enough soldiers to defend their provinces as it was also a dispersed-force defense system. It requires the concentrated use of forced local forces to defend their defense perimeters, and the Bupiljeoktajinjijobeob rule prevents provinces from coming to each other's aid. They requested military commanders from the central government who did not know a familiar province's terrain.

Jeseungbangryak System
Joseon army mobilizes its troops through the Jeseungbangryak system. It allowed the military commanders from the central government to control assembled troops from the main army to the local and provincial armies. But, local officers could not individually respond to a foreign invasion outside their jurisdiction until a higher ranking general, appointed by the king's court, arrived with a newly mobilized army. It was a highly inefficient arrangement since the nearby forces would remain stationary until the mobile border commander arrived on the scene and took control. Secondly, as the appointed General often came from an outside region. The general was unlikely unfamiliar with the natural environment, the available technology, and staffing of the invaded region. Finally, as the government never maintained the main army, new and ill-trained recruits conscripted during war constituted a significant part of the army.

Sogo System
Seonjo established the Sogo System in 1593, a militia system during the Imjin war based on the Ming Chinese militia system and military texts. He believed a communal nature of the defense forces would prevent the populace from deserting and allow the country to respond more quickly to invasions. Under this system, county magistrates or army commanders organized all families of the Joseon Society from villages and counties into militia armies with hierarchical command structures. They have access to the resources for maintaining and rewarding the soldiers. Five households each contributed a man to form the basic unit, an o. The o’s in a village or town were progressively amalgamated and arranged into eleven-man squads (tae) including a squad leader (taech’ong), three-squad banners (ki), three-banner companies (ch’o), and five-company battalions (sa), five battalions constituted a regiment (yŏng) of approximately 2,475 men. The Sogo Armies performed disastrously during the Manchu Invasions due to the county magistrates' poor management and outright corruption, who packed them with the old, weak, and infirm soldiers. During Heonjong's reign, he reduced them to a corvée labor force, and their garrison commanders operated in the realms of public safety and pacification as thief-catching and tiger killing.

Garrison Command System
After the Manchu invasion of Korea, Injo established the Garrison Command System (Yŏngjang chedo) to take over the training and military preparation of Joseon and separated the military administration from the civil interference of the provincial magistrates. The Garrison Command System replaced recruitment with universal conscription, which like the Sogo system, required all citizens of Joseon to enlist because most regions lacked enough population base to maintain more than three. During Yeongjo's reign, the number of garrisons had grown to forty-nine, with nine in Pyeongan and six in Hamgyŏng Province. The other provinces had at least five, except for Kangwŏn, which could still only maintain there.  Garrison commanders (yŏngjang) primary duty was to administer the provincial military structure and command garrisons. They also served a concurrent role of sheriffs (t'op'osa), shifting from military defense to catching criminals and suppressing local unrest. Magistrates were frequently appointed as garrison commanders, only nominally separating their duties. However, military men could be appointed separately to a garrison command in the southern regions without posting concurrent magistrate (paech'i). Nonetheless, the garrison commanders throughout the peninsula were increasingly responsible for civil policing activities at the expense of their military duties.

Modern Armies
The Joseon Army, as it existed in the early 1890s, consisted of about 3,000–50,000 soldiers at the time of the Donghak Peasant Revolution. There were about 5,000 soldiers in 1895. Training by Russian officers beginning in 1896 led to the organization of a 1,000-strong royal bodyguard armed with Berdan rifles that served as the core of an improved army. Soldiers sometimes transferred to other units from this core unit, including five regiments of about 900 soldiers each. When the Joseon Dynasty became the Korean Empire, their numbers grew to 28,000 before 1907.

Equipment

Uniforms

Soldiers and military officials wear military uniforms (kunbok). The peasant soldiers wore black military robes (hyeopsu) with white trimes and light blue long sleeveless vests (jeonbok) representing the central army and provincial armies. White vests are worn by soldiers of the Military Training Command. Red vests representing military police and yellow vests for military bands. Commissioned officers (usually military yangban) wore a red and yellow (or organge) military officials coat (dongdari) for middle to high-ranking officers and red and blue dongdari for junior-ranking officers with a black jeonbok and a military belt (jeondae). During emergencies and wartime, officers, Pengbaesu, and Gabsa wore war clothing (yungbok) distinguishing rank by color. Red yungbok with a blue military belt represents high-ranking officers. Blue yungbok with a red military belt represents mid-ranking officers. Black yungbok with a black military belt represents junior ranking officers and elite soldiers and cavalry. High and middle-ranking officers wore hats called jeonrip. Soldiers of all ranks and low-ranking officers wore hats called beonggeoji.

Modern Uniforms
In the 1880s, a new Joseon military uniform, the gyoryeonbyeonbok replaced the old ones. The Pyŏlgigun, the Muwiyŏng, the Changŏyŏng, and the Chingunyeong wore an upper garment of the hanbok jeogori with a square-shaped neck collar from the bangryeong jacket, five metal buttons, and sleeve collars that denote a rank. One collar for a private and two for an officer. They also wore an inner jacket (naegapui) underneath their uniforms for added protection. They wore a belt at the chest or waist length, a jeonrip with a red strap denoting a soldier's names and units, and a peacock feather for officers. During the Donghak Peasant Revolution and the early Sino-Japanese war, the Chingunyeong wore navy-blue western overcoats with white ankle-length baggy pants baji. During the late Sino-Japanese and the Gabo Reform, the Joseon army wore black western overcoats and pants while maintaining the jeonrip. In 1895 at the time of Queen Min's assassination and after the Gabo Reform, the army adopted western uniforms with pith helmets, white uniforms with blanket rolls for the central and provincial army soldiers and black uniforms for officers. At the start of the Gwangmu Reform, they began adopting German-style uniforms.

Armor
In the early dynasty, the army wore chain mail (swaejagab) and plate and mail armor (gyeongbeongap) from the late Goryeo dynasty. The peasant conscripts wore helmets but no armor. However, the Joseon military policy required peasant conscripts to provide their armor. Chain mail, paper armor (jigap), and padded armor made from cotton layers, iron plats, and (or) leather (eomshimgap) were popular among peasant soldiers in the provincial armies as they offered body protection at lower prices. Sets of leather armor worn by peasant soldiers are called Pigabju. The central army's Pengbaesu wore chain mail and plate armor. Still, they, along with the Gabsa wore a traditional form of Korean armor that persisted with the Mongols' influences during the 13~14th centuries, lamellar armor (jalgap). It was a complete metallic armor set. It was composed of a helmet resembling European kettle hats with attached neck defenses of mail or lamellar, body armor reaching down to the thighs or knees, and a set of shoulder guards that protected the upper arm.

In the late dynasty, the dujeonggap is the Korean equivalent of brigandine. The Pengbaesu, Gabsa, and peasant conscripts wore brigandine made from cotton layers, and the plates weaved into the brigandine were either iron, copper, or leather. It became the primary form of Korean armor and often reached below the knees when worn. The helmet assumes a conical shape and has three brigandine flaps that protect the sides and back of the head. The high-ranking officers wore brass scales, and middle-low-ranking officers wore iron. The elite soldiers and the cavalry wore iron or copper in the main army, while peasant soldiers wore leather in the provincial army.

In the 19th century, the Joseon Army's armor usage declined as heavy cavalry and generals relied on armor while foot soldiers and light cavalry wore only uniforms. In 1867, an attempt was made to develop anti-ballistic armor called Myeonje baegab, made from 13 to 30 sewed sheets of textiles and cotton combined into a thick vest to the overwhelming firepower of rifles fielded by Western powers such as France and the United States. Although this attempt was partially in line with the current method of producing anti-ballistic vests, it does not appear to have proved effective. In the late 1870s, Korean armor fell into disuse completely.

Melee Weapons
The standard Korean sword was the hwando, a short and light curved sword commonly used by Joseon soldiers during peacetime. The standard Korean spear was the dangpa, a 7–8 ft three-pronged trident with a spear tip in the middle used for close defensive combat to trap an enemy's sword between two of the three prongs. Another polearm used in the army was the jangchang, a four-meter spear wielded by infantry, and cavalry, for thrusting and drawing while moving forward and backward. But due to its long lengthen, they cannot use this spear for throwing. The woldo was a 9 ft curved-bladed polearm with a spike at the end of the handle and a tassel or feather attached to the blade. The woldo was mostly used by cavalry for its heavy striking power while on horseback. The infantry but mostly cavalry used the pyeongon, a -long flail made from hardwood stick, painted red, acting as the handle for a chain attached to a shaft with iron nails. The Pengbaesu carry a pengbae, a round shield, or a deungpaea, a rattan shield along with a sword.

Projectile Weapons

Archery

Archers also used the pyeonjeon, a short arrow, and the tongah to help guide it as part of the standard kit of Chosun era archers. They can fire at an extended range of 350 meters and flatter trajectories with a faster velocity and penetrating power than regular arrows. Their quivers held 20 arrows and 10 pyeonjeon arrows. They also used repeating crossbows and crossbows.

Gunpowder

In 1395, several weapons were in use: a series of cannons called the daejanggunpo, ijanggunpo, and samjanggunpo, a shell-firing mortar called the jillyeopo, a series of yuhwa, juhwa, and chokcheonhwa rockets, which were the forerunners of the singijeon, and a signal gun called the shinpo. These cannons improved during Taejong's rule. Among the people responsible for the developments was Choe Hae-san, son of Choe Mu-seon. Yi Si-ae's Rebellion was the first time in Joseon history the Joseon Army utilized many different kinds of (gunpowder) weapons. Weapons, including the shield walls for defending against chongtong and chongtong to destroy the shield walls and hwacha for significant damage in massive fire combats during battles of Yi Si-ae's Rebellion. During the Imjin War, they mainly used the cannon in siege action and defending castles. The Nanjung ilgi says that many captured and used by the Japanese realized their full potential. There were few instances of Koreans employing artillery in the field, with largely ineffective results. Some irregular Korean units with government-supplied weapons fired explosive shells from mortars, but this occurred only in isolated instances.

The Koreans use the hwacha – multiple rocket-propelled arrows. The hwacha consisted of a two-wheeled cart carrying a board filled with holes into which the soldiers inserted singijeons. It could fire up to 200 singijeon, a type of rocket arrow, all at once. The hwacha also has a variant called the munjong hwacha. It can simultaneously fire 100 rocket arrows or 200 small chongtong bullets with changeable modules. Another variant was the mangam hwacha, a boxed cart with large faces of a dokkaebi painted on all three sides of the cart. Armed with forty seungja-chongtongs with fourteen in the front and thirteen on the left and right sides, only two soldiers can manage it, one firing the rows and the other reloads. They can fire 600 bullets, with each barrel holding 15 shots. The hwacha mainly was deployed during the Siege of Pyongyang in January 1593 and the Battle of Haengju in March 1593.

The cheon "heaven" or "sky," Ji "earth," Hyeon "black," and Hwang "yellow" or "gold" names are not significant, being the first four characters of the Thousand Character Classic. His son, Sejong, also made many improvements and increased the ranges of these cannons (called hwapo and later hwatong "fire tube" and chongtong "gun tube"). The seungja "victory gun," was a chongtong that serves as a standard Korean gun. It was a handheld shotgun-like cannon attached to a staff that fired by lighting a fuse, a large arrow, a bullet, and 15 small pellets. The gunners used the seungja chongtong as a two-handed club in melee combat. Another variant was the soseungja chongtong, a handheld cannon attached to a gunstock that fired a bullet and a large arrow; like the seungja, it could only fire by lighting the fuse. In the early 1500s, the bullanggi (불랑기/佛狼機), a breech-loading swivel gun, was introduced to Korea from Portugal via China. It was divided into sizes 1 through 5, in decreasing size. The small but powerful cannons of this era saw extensive use during the Japanese invasions of Korea (1592–98) by both the Joseon Army and the navy. Mortars used at this time were the chongtong-wan'gue, byeoldae-wan'gu, dae-wan'gu, jung-wan'gu, and so-wan'gu. These fired stones, or the bigeukjincheonre, are timed explosive shells. In 1596, the seungja were phased out in favor of Japanese-style muskets and arquebuses. The Koreans called these jochong (조총/鳥銃), which means 'An accurate gun even shoot down a flying bird.' The Hong'ipo was a cannon introduced from the Netherlands by Hendrick Hamel and others in the 1650s. Joseon also used this cannon during the 1866 French campaign against Korea, the 1871 United States expedition to Korea, and the Ganghwa Island incident of September 20, 1875.

Modern Weapons
The Joseon dynasty attempted to reverse-engineer European firearms to counter their rising threat in the 19th century. When the Americans captured Ganghwa Island's coastal fortresses, the Joseon Army first used these modern weapons to reinforce the island. After signing the Treaty of Ganghwa, Japan, Qing, the United States, and the European nations started importing modern weapons such as rifles, artillery, machine guns, western sabers, and bayonets in 1883 until its annexation in 1910. From 1887, Gojong even tried to make weapons by themselves which however never succeed.

Strategy and Tactics

Joseon's longtime foe, the Jurchens, adopted cavalry mobile warfare and made numerous raids on Joseon's Northern Borders. The Joseon army focused on developing anti-cavalry tactics to counter them. Their main battle tactic is to arm their infantry and cavalry with long-range weaponry to weaken their cavalry charge from a distance and then engage them quickly and fluently. But in an actual combat situation, the cavalry charges into the enemy's spearhead formation and the battle formation.

During the Imjin War, when the army formed their battle positions like the Joseon cavalry formations against the Jurchens, they were withered down by a hail of Japanese arquebuses. Then, the Japanese ashigaru engaged in close-quarters combat. But what the Koreans lack in numbers can make up for it in topography and geography. The Righteous Army utilized stalling tactics to hamper Japanese supply chains on land, but the central army could not use them until the second half of the Imjin war.

See also
Joseon Navy
Joseon Dynasty
Righteous Army
Korean–Jurchen border conflicts
Imjin War
List of battles during the Japanese invasions of Korea (1592–1598)

References

Military history of Korea
Joseon dynasty
Former armies by country